The Illinois Natural History Survey (INHS), located on the campus of the University of Illinois Urbana-Champaign in Champaign, Illinois, is an active research institution with over 200 staff members, and it maintains one of the largest State-operated museums in the United States, with collections totaling over 9.5 million specimens of amphibians, annelids, birds, crustaceans, fish, fungi, insects, mammals, mollusks, plants, and reptiles from around the world. It is part of the Prairie Research Institute.

References

External links
 
 Feltman, Rachel (July 30, 2014). "New cricket discovered in long-neglected amber collection." Washington Post.

University of Illinois Urbana-Champaign
Natural history museums in Illinois
Natural Science Collections Alliance members
University museums in Illinois
1858 establishments in Illinois